2959 Scholl, provisional designation , is a carbonaceous Hildian asteroid from the outer regions of the asteroid belt, approximately 34 kilometers in diameter. It was discovered on 4 September 1983 by English–American astronomer Edward Bowell of the Lowell Observatory at Anderson Mesa Station near Flagstaff, Arizona. The asteroid was named after German astronomer Hans Scholl.

Orbit and classification 

Scholl is a member of the Hilda family, a large group that orbits in resonance with the gas giant Jupiter and are thought to originate from the Kuiper belt. Scholl orbits the Sun at a distance of 2.9–5.0 AU once every 7 years and 10 months (2,861 days). Its orbit has an eccentricity of 0.27 and an inclination of 5° with respect to the ecliptic.

Physical characteristics 

Scholl is an assumed carbonaceous C-type asteroid.

Rotation period 

A rotational lightcurve of Scholl was obtained from photometric observations by Swedish, Spanish, Italian and German astronomers. Published in 1998, the fragmentary lightcurve gave a rotation period of 16 hours with a brightness amplitude of 0.14 magnitude.

Diameter and albedo 

According to the surveys carried out by the Infrared Astronomical Satellite IRAS, the Japanese Akari satellite, and the NEOWISE mission of NASA's Wide-field Infrared Survey Explorer, Scholl measures between 32.783 and 45.60 kilometers in diameter and its surface has an albedo between 0.04 and 0.054.

The Collaborative Asteroid Lightcurve Link derives an albedo of 0.055 and a diameter of 34.15 kilometers based on an absolute magnitude of 11.1.

Naming 

This minor planet was named in honor of German astronomer Hans Scholl (born 1942), who worked at the Astronomical Calculation Institute, Heidelberg, and Côte d'Azur Observatory in Nice, France. He is a co-discoverer of many minor planets and three moons of Uranus.

The official naming citation was published by the Minor Planet Center on 15 May 1984.

References

External links 
 Asteroid Lightcurve Database (LCDB), query form (info )
 Dictionary of Minor Planet Names, Google books
 Asteroids and comets rotation curves, CdR – Observatoire de Genève, Raoul Behrend
 Discovery Circumstances: Numbered Minor Planets (1)-(5000) – Minor Planet Center
 
 

002959
Discoveries by Edward L. G. Bowell
Named minor planets
19830904